Krzyków may refer to the following places in Poland:
Krzyków, Lower Silesian Voivodeship (south-west Poland)
Krzyków, Opole Voivodeship (south-west Poland)